"Bla Bla Bla" is a song written and recorded by Italian DJ Gigi D'Agostino. It was released in May 1999 as the third single from the album L'Amour Toujours. It reached number 3 in Austria and number 15 in France.

This song is made with a sample from the British band Stretch's song "Why did you do it". The beginning of the second complete: "I've been thinking about what..." is used to create the vocal loop of the track.

Music video
The song also featured a popular music video, which was directed by Andreas Hykade and Ged Haney at Studio Film Bilder GmbH, in the style of Italian animated series La Linea. The music video shows a boy with a floating head and no arms walking toward what appears to be a shark that multiplies itself and can change direction. This style was also used in "The Riddle", another song by Gigi D'Agostino, originally by British singer Nik Kershaw.

Chart performance

Weekly charts

Year-end charts

References

1999 singles
Animated music videos
Gigi D'Agostino songs
1999 songs
ZYX Music singles
EMI Records singles
Arista Records singles
Songs written by Gigi D'Agostino